El Samraa or Sumra was a speckled grey Arabian mare. [http://daughterofthewind.org/on-the-meaning-of-the-phrase-hab-el-rih-and-nabt-el-shih-bint-el-shikh/ The name of her sire, Hab El Rih, and dam, Bint El Sheik are not given names but Arabian phrases and mean that she was Asil, a purebred Arabian horse. Her owner Sheikh Omar Abd El Hafiz sold her in 1931 to Fuad I of Egypt for his private Inshass Stud. The name El Samraa/Sumra means soft, light tanned color.

References

Individual Arabian and part-Arabian horses